Krishna Gundopant Ginde, better known as K.G. Ginde (26 December 1925 – 13 July 1994) was an Indian classical singer and teacher. His guru S N Ratanjankar was his biggest influence.

Biography
Ginde, called "Chhotu" (small) by family members and close friends because he was the 8th among 9 children, was born on December 26, 1925, in Bailhongal, near Belgaum. When he was just 11 years old, he moved to Lucknow and started his music training under music scholar S N Ratanjankar.

He moved to Mumbai in 1951 to take up a teaching post with Bharatiya Vidya Bhavan. In 1962 he became principal of Vallabh Sangeet Vidyalaya.

On his sixtieth birthday, some of the biggest names in Hindustani music, including Bhimsen Joshi, Kumar Gandharva, and Purushottam Laxman Deshpande, graced the function.

Ginde died on July 13, 1994, age 68 in Calcutta after suffering a massive heart attack.

References

 http://www.chembur.com/anecdotes/ginde.htm

1925 births
1994 deaths
Hindustani singers
Singers from Karnataka
20th-century Indian male classical singers
Indian music educators
Indian male composers
Hindustani composers
Indian musicologists
20th-century Indian composers
People from Belagavi district
20th-century musicologists
Recipients of the Sangeet Natak Akademi Award